George Mihai Micle (born 8 November 2001) is a Romanian professional footballer who plays as a goalkeeper for Liga I side FC Argeș Pitești.

External links
 

2001 births
Living people
Sportspeople from Satu Mare
Romanian footballers
Association football goalkeepers
FC Steaua București players
CS Sportul Snagov players
FC Argeș Pitești players
FC Universitatea Cluj players
Liga I players
Liga II players